Dunthorpe is an affluent unincorporated suburb of Portland, Oregon, United States. It is located just south of the Portland city limits and north of the Multnomah County line on the west side of the Willamette River. Lewis & Clark College, Tryon Creek State Park, and Lake Oswego are nearby. Since 2020, it has been designated as a Census Designated Place

Demographics

History
In January 1916, William M. Ladd's Ladd Estate Company purchased  from the soon to be dissolved Oregon Iron & Steel Company for $1.  The company drafted very specific provisions for the Dunthorpe development, including: Only residential buildings were allowed, except for outbuildings to house domestic animals; Swine and goats were prohibited; The minimum cost of a house was $3000; No residence could be used or occupied by "persons of African or Mongolian descent" unless they were employed as servants of the masters; and the sale of "intoxicating liquor" was also prohibited.

Arts and culture

Museums and other points of interest
The garden is open to the public seven days a week and is widely known for the many varieties of magnolias as well as for examples of many other native and exotic plants.

Education
Riverdale School District in Dunthorpe is among the best academically performing school districts in Oregon by various measures, including standardized test scores, which are frequently the best in the state. According to 24/7 Wall St.'s analysis of U.S. Census data from 2006 through 2010, the Riverdale School District is the third richest school district in the United States.

As a community, Dunthorpe was historically anchored by Riverdale Grade School. In the early 1990s, the Oregon legislature decreed that all school districts should have both primary and secondary schools, and expected smaller school districts like Riverdale to merge.  While an old grade school was purchased and renovated for use as Riverdale High School, high school students were bussed to nearby Marylhurst University in the neighboring city of West Linn, where space was leased by the school district.

In September 2002, the high school moved into its permanent building, a renovation and expansion of an existing but unused public school structure. In November 2008, the voters of Riverdale School District passed a measure authorizing the District to issue bonds in an amount up to $21.5 million to renovate and expand the existing grade school building. In July 2009, the original grade school was demolished. The building was rebuilt in the style of the original in 2010.

Notable residents

LaMarcus Aldridge (1985–), professional basketball player
Brandin Cooks (1993–), professional football player
Maurice E. Crumpacker (1886–1927), U.S. congressman from Oregon 
Clyde Drexler (1962–), retired professional basketball player and Hall of Famer
Channing Frye (1983–), professional basketball player
Danny Glover (1946–), actor
Bob Packwood (1932–), former U.S. senator from Oregon 
Terry Porter (1963–), professional basketball coach and former player
Linus Torvalds (1969–), software engineer; developer of Linux
William McCormick (1939-), US Ambassador to New Zealand

References

External links

Portland metropolitan area
Unincorporated communities in Multnomah County, Oregon
Unincorporated communities in Oregon
Populated places on the Willamette River